Patrick Conlon may refer to:

Patrick Conlon (artist), American tattooist and comics illustrator
Patrick Conlon (politician) (born 1959), Australian Labor Party politician
Patrick Conlon, a member of the Maguire Seven 
Paddy Conlon (publican), Australian publican
P. J. Conlon (born 1993), Irish-American baseball player